GMF may refer to:

 Galactic magnetic field
 Garantie Mutuelle des Fonctionnaires, now part of Covéa, a French insurance company
 General mail facility
 General Motors Foundation, an American philanthropic organization
 Genetically modified food
 German Marshall Fund, an American public policy institution
 Glia maturation factor
 Global Mayors' Forum, an international conference
 GMF AeroAsia, an Indonesian aircraft-maintenance company
 GM Financial, an American financial services company
 Graphical Modeling Framework, a framework within the Eclipse platform
 Ground Mobile Forces, a military communications system
 Gulf of Mexico Foundation
 "GMF", a 2013 song by American musician John Grant
 Glucosyloxymethylfurfural, a glycosylated derivative of hydroxymethylfurfural